Newcastle Sunday is the 45th release by avant- folk/blues singer-songwriter Jandek, released by Corwood Industries.  It is a recording of his second ever live performance, recorded at The Sage Gateshead, England.

Like 2005's Glasgow Sunday, Newcastle Sunday features the Corwood Representative on vocals and guitar along with bassist Richard Youngs and drummer Alex Neilson, although neither sideman is credited on the album's cover. It is also notable for being Corwood Industries' first-ever double-CD release.

The DVD counterpart to this title was released later in the same year.  Like the Glasgow Sunday DVD, the Newcastle Sunday DVD features 2 camera angles, but, unlike its predecessor, it does not feature an edited mix of the two.

The front cover shows a medieval stone castle, identified by a member of the Jandek discussion group as Dover Castle in Kent, in the South East of England.

Track listing

Disc one

Disc two

See also
 Corwood Industries discography

References

External links 
 Corwood Industries homepage
 Guide to Jandek by Seth Tisue
 about Jandek's live performances

Jandek live albums
2006 live albums
2006 video albums